Leviathan Wakes is a science fiction novel by James S. A. Corey, the pen name of American writers Daniel Abraham and Ty Franck. It is the first book in the Expanse series, followed by Caliban's War (2012), Abaddon's Gate (2013) and six other novels. Leviathan Wakes was nominated for the 2012 Hugo Award for Best Novel and the 2012 Locus Award for Best Science Fiction Novel. The novel was adapted for television in 2015 as the first season-and-a-half of The Expanse by Syfy. Five short stories that take place before, during, or after Leviathan Wakes were published between 2011 and 2019.

Setting
Leviathan Wakes is set in a future in which humanity has colonized much of the Solar System. Earth, governed by the United Nations, and the Martian Congressional Republic act as competing superpowers, maintaining an uneasy military alliance in order to exert dual hegemony over the peoples of the Asteroid belt, known as "Belters". Belters, whose bodies tend to be thin and elongated owing to their low-gravity environments, carry out the gritty, blue-collar work that provides the system with essential natural resources, but are largely marginalized by the rest of the Solar System polity. This class conflict particularly manifests itself in The Outer Planets Alliance (OPA), a network of loosely-aligned militant groups, which seeks to combat the Belt's exploitation at the hands of the "Inners", who, in turn, have collectively branded the OPA a terrorist organization.

Save for the prologue and epilogue, the story is presented exclusively in third-person perspective by Belter detective Joe Miller, and Earther XO Jim Holden.

Plot summary

The ice hauling ship Canterbury (nicknamed the Cant by Belters) is en route from Saturn's Rings to Ceres Station when it encounters a distress signal. Five members of the Cant's crew are dispatched in a shuttle to investigate: executive officer James "Jim" Holden, a former officer in the UN Navy (UNN); chief engineer Naomi Nagata, a Belter; pilot Alex Kamal, a veteran of the Martian navy (MCRN); engineer Amos Burton; and medic Shed Garvey. They discover an abandoned transport vessel called the Scopuli. They find no trace of the ship's crew, but they do discover the beacon transmitting the distress signal. Suspecting that the ship may be a trap set by pirates, they take the beacon and begin returning to the Cant. Before they can make it, an unknown stealth warship arrives and, without warning, destroys the Cant with nuclear weaponry. Holden sends an angry message to the attacking ship, but it ignores him and departs. Based on the highly advanced technology of the warship and the discovery that the beacon from the Scopuli is of Martian origin, the survivors suspect the MCRN of being behind the attack.

With the shuttle damaged by the debris field, lacking the necessary fuel or supplies to reach a port, and fearful that should they put out a distress signal of their own, the attackers may return, Holden broadcasts a message out to the entire system implicating Mars in the destruction of the Cant, hoping to negate any attempt to kill them as part of a cover-up. In response, the shuttle is ordered to rendezvous with the MCRN battleship Donnager, flagship of Mars' Jupiter Fleet. En route, they receive a message from Fred Johnson, chief of Tycho Station, an engineering outpost and construction platform, who offers his support. Johnson had been a highly decorated commander in the UNN years earlier when he was ordered to brutally quell a Belter uprising, for which he was nicknamed the "Butcher of Anderson Station." Guilt-stricken, he had resigned his commission and become an advocate for the rights of Belters. As the shuttle makes its way to the rendezvous, they are pursued by a group of unknown ships.

On Ceres Station, the pragmatic detective Josephus "Joe" Miller of Star Helix Security, the Earth-based private security firm responsible for policing the station, is illicitly contracted to locate Julie Mao, daughter of wealthy magnate Jules-Pierre Mao, and send her back to her family on Luna against her will. He suspects that this request, and the disappearance of the young woman herself, are connected to unusual power vacuums in the station's various criminal cartels. When Holden's message reaches Ceres, riots erupt; Miller and his squad then discover that the station's riot gear is missing.

Aboard the Donnager, the ship's captain denies any knowledge of MCRN involvement in the attack on the Canterbury, and instead suspects that one or more of the survivors from the shuttle may have bombed the Cant as an act of OPA terrorism. The unknown ships that were pursuing the shuttle ignore warnings to change course and are fired on by the Donnager. To the surprise of the Martian crew, the ships return fire and are revealed to be the same stealth ships that attacked the Cant. Despite the fact that the Donnager is one of the most advanced and deadly warships in the Solar System, it is steadily overwhelmed by the mysterious enemy ships and eventually boarded. During the battle, a railgun round penetrates the hull, decapitating Shed.

Realizing that the Cant survivors are the targets of the attack, a team of the Donnager's Marine contingent are ordered to evacuate them. Although all of the Martian Marines are killed in the process, the four surviving Cant crew members are able to escape aboard the corvette Tachi just before the Donnager is scuttled. Still unsure of who is trying to kill them, they decide to flee to Tycho Station. There, the Cant survivors share what they've seen with Fred Johnson, who reveals that he is an influential member of the OPA. They receive new transponder codes for the Tachi from Fred, disguise the ship as a gas hauler, and rename it the Rocinante. Fred sends the Roci (as her crew nicknames her) to Eros Station to find an OPA operative working under the pseudonym Lionel Polanski.
On Cerus Miller discovers that Julie Mao's father had warned her of an attack in the Belt just two weeks before the destruction of the Cant. He is then confronted by Anderson Dawes, leader of the Ceres chapter of the OPA, who tells him that Julie Mao had joined the OPA and had disappeared while performing an important mission for them aboard the Scopuli. Dawes cautions Miller not to investigate the matter any further. Miller presents this information to his boss, Captain Shaddid, but she also instructs him to drop the case. Miller, however, finds himself obsessing over Julie and, when he persists, he is fired by Shaddid, who is revealed to be in collusion with Dawes.  This event tips Miller further into cynicism and amorality, and he begins drinking heavily. However he is still able to research the docking logs for all of the ports in the Belt (to which he had been granted access to before his termination). Realizing that the Scopuli was the same ship mentioned in Holden's broadcast, he is able to discern that the Rocinante is the former Tachi from its registry information, whereupon he departs for Eros.

On Eros, Miller finds the crew of the Roci at a hotel where Lionel Polanski is listed as a guest. The crew is subjected to a clumsy kidnapping attempt in the lobby which quickly turns into a shoot-out; Miller, who had been surveilling the situation helps to defeat the hit squad, whereupon he throws his fortunes with them. In Polanski's room (which Miller investigates as a detective, treating it as a crime scene) they find the body of Julie Mao in the shower infected with a strange, eldritch organic growth. On her phone, Miller finds logs detailing the progression of her affliction, which seems to be fueled by exposure to energy and radiation, and the coordinates of an asteroid where one of the ships that attacked the Cant is docked.

Before Miller and the remaining crew of the Roci can even begin to leave the station, however, a station-wide radiation alert is issued and security begins herding people en masse into the numerous radiation shelters. Miller recognizes some of the security officers as criminals from Ceres, who furthermore are equipped with the missing Star Helix riot gear. He and Holden stay behind to investigate whilst the rest of the crew attempts to return the Roci.

Miller and Holden discover that the people herded into the shelters, all comatose, have been dosed with an unknown substance and exposed to extremely high levels of radiation. As they stealthily make their way to the docks they realize that the people in the shelters had been infected with the same organism as Julie and the radiation is being used to feed its rapid growth. They then some of the infected, zombie-like attacking the security forces, spreading the infection via vomit. Suffering from the beginning symptoms of radiation poisoning, they manage to rejoin the crew of the Roci and escape Eros.

Fred contacts Holden and tells him that analysis of a data chip belonging to one of the dead Marines from the Donnager reveals that the mysterious stealth ships were built on Luna. Holden makes another public broadcast sharing this information, hoping to ease the tensions created by his prior implicating of the MCRN. This strategy backfires, however, and the UN, fearing that they will be blamed for the attack on the Donnager, launch a preemptive strike against the MCRN by destroying Deimos, site of a Martian military installation, which results in a standoff between the two sides.

Miller and the crew of the Roci follow the coordinates from Julie's phone only to find one of the stealth ships, the Anubis, derelict and abandoned. In the reactor room they discover that same alien organic growth which had consumed Julie Mao had consumed the entire remaining crew of the Anubis (as well as that of the rest of the crew of Scopuli, whom they had taken prisoner). The victims of the alien organism cover the reactor in a disparate gelatinous conglomeration. 

The team finds a video explaining that the organism is a biological replication mechanism created by extrasolar aliens with the intent of reaching Earth and hijacking its early biosphere in order to create something for its own mysterious purposes, but which had been captured by Saturn's gravity and stranded Phoebe, which allowed Earth to follow its own evolutionary path. Protogen, the corporation which had discovered the entity on Phoebe and dubbed it the "protomolecule," orchestrated its release on Eros as an experiment, in an attempt to discover what it was designed to do. To this end they had carried out the false flag attack on the Cant in order to start a war which would distract the Solar System from what criminal operation on Eros. The Roci crew nuke the Anubis and return to Tycho Station, where they discover that data is being transmitted from Eros to a secret Protogen facility. They attack the station, with the Roci destroying the two stealth ships guarding it, and Miller and Fred leading a boarding party consisting of Fred's OPA soldiers, who are able to capture it in the face of fierce resistance.

The lead scientist and commander of the research station, Antony Dresden, reveals that all of the scientists on the station had been "modified to remove ethical restraints" so that they could perform their research as sociopaths, without empathy for the victims on Eros. He emphasizes the importance of understanding the Protomolecule, not only for its innate scientific value, but because it is humanity's key to the stars, and as a corollary to protect against the clear threat presented by the aliens who created it. Realizing that Dresden's rationale is likely to be accepted by the powers that be on Earth and Mars, and thus that this horrific research would allowed to continue, Miller summarily executes Dresden without warning, angering Holden. "He was going to get away with it," Miller later explains, "He was talking us into it. All that about getting the stars and protecting ourselves from whatever shot that thing at Earth? I was starting to think maybe he should get away with it. Maybe things were just too big for right and wrong."

Back on Tycho, Miller forces Fred's hand and they come up with a plan to completely destroy Eros in order to preclude anyone else from attempting to obtain a sample of the protomolecule. They intend to commandeer Tycho's main project, the massive Mormon generation ship Nauvoo, and crash it into Eros at the correct speed and angle to propel it into the Sun. Miller leads a team onto the exterior of Eros to plant bombs to detonate all of its ports, and then decides, existentially at the end of his rope, to stay behind and die when they go off. Just before the Nauvoo impacts the station, however, the trajectory of Eros is suddenly and inexplicably altered.

The Protomolecule proves to have an advanced method of spaceflight which, unlike the Epstein drive, negates both g-force and inertia. Eros then sets out for Earth, the largest source of biomass in the Solar System, at a speed that no human-made ship can match. Miller takes one of the bombs into the station to attempt to destroy its maneuvering capabilities. However, listening to the voices on the communication system, he realizes that Eros is being guided by Julie Mao, who believes she is piloting her racing pinnace. He finds that her infected body is the host in a symbiotic relationship with the protomolecule. Used for the Protomolecule's own ends, she retains enough agency for him to convince her to direct Eros away from Earth. The station shortly crashes onto the surface of Venus, where in a cliff hanger ending the Protomolecule promptly begins assembling a mysterious structure.

Reception
Kirkus Reviews, Locus Online and other reviewers praised the novel. The book's action sequences were highlighted by SF Signal, and Tor.com wrote that the book had a "satisfying volume completion".  Wired.com's GeekDad praised the novel for not containing "overly-complex descriptions of the way governments and corporations work" or "made-up words and cryptic names". Guy Molinari "expressed surprise" that a fictional outer space "cargo ship Guy Molinari" was named in 2012 after the NYC Staten Island "Guy V Molinari" ferry.

One of the main subtexts of the novel has been highlighted by Frederick A. de Armas who discusses in detail the many elements derived from Miguel de Cervantes's Don Quixote. In Chapter 17 of the novel, for example, a crew on the run, led by earther Jim Holden is given command of a state-of-the-art Martian frigate. After being pursued they are able to use a new transponder to disguise the ship: "Holden punched the comm system on the wall. 'Well, crew, welcome to the gas freighter Rocinante. 'What does the name even mean?' Naomi said after he let go of the comm button. 'It means we need to find some windmills.'". In addition to a fast freighter given the name of Don Quixote's horse, De Armas studies the uses of parody in the novel; the quixotic attitudes that develop in Jim Holden and Joe Miller; the image of Julie Mao as Dulcinea; and the meaning of the windmills or giants. For Robin Seemangal, who relies more on the television series than on the novel, the quixotic windmills have to do with perception. As James Holden comes up on a plain with windmills, these could refer to the UN, Mars or the OPA "and how he perceives them many not be what they are".

Sequels 

Leviathan Wakes was followed by the novel Caliban's War in 2012 and Abaddon's Gate in 2013. It was announced in 2012 that Orbit Books had ordered a further three books in the Expanse series, in addition to five novellas set in the same universe. The first of these sequels was announced in September 2013 as Cibola Burn and was released on June 17, 2014, in hardcover, Kindle, and on Audible in the US. Later additions to the series include Nemesis Games, Babylon's Ashes, Persepolis Rising, Tiamat's Wrath, and finally Leviathan Falls.

Short stories

"Drive" 
"Drive" is set before Leviathan Wakes. Released on November 27, 2012, it is only seven pages long. "Drive" was originally published as part of the sci-fi anthology Edge of Infinity edited by Jonathan Strahan. It was made available to read free on the Syfy website. In the short story, Solomon Epstein, the inventor of the modified fusion drive he dubs "The Epstein Drive", which allows  spaceships to travel much faster, further and for a longer amount of time, tests out his creation, realizing that he's going so fast he cannot stop, and will have to wait for the fuel to run out so he can contact another ship and ask them to save him, though he notes that they will have to have twice as much burn on their ship as his to go out and back to get him.

"The Churn" 
"The Churn" is set before Leviathan Wakes. It was published on April 29, 2014, and consisted of 75 pages, making it the longest of the non-novel stories published by James S. A. Corey, tied with "Gods of Risk".

"The Butcher of Anderson Station" 
"The Butcher of Anderson Station" is set before Leviathan Wakes. It was published on October 17, 2011, and consisted of 40 pages.

"The Last Flight of the Cassandra" 
"The Last Flight of the Cassandra" takes place during the events of Leviathan Wakes and was released on May 14, 2019. At only five pages long, The Last Flight of the Cassandra is the shortest story yet. It was also included in The Expanse Role-Playing Game rulebook published by Green Ronin Publishing.

"The Vital Abyss" 
"The Vital Abyss" spans a time period from before Leviathan Wakes to well into the fourth novel in the series, Cibola Burn. Published on October 15, 2015, it is the second-longest novella by James S. A. Corey at 74 pages long.

References

External links 
 The blog of the authors.
 The web site for the series. 

433 Eros
2011 American novels
2011 science fiction novels
American science fiction novels
Fiction about main-belt asteroids
Novels set on Mars
Fiction about near-Earth asteroids
Novels about terrorism
Novels by James S. A. Corey
Science fiction horror novels
Space opera novels
The Expanse
Novels set on Venus
Orbit Books books